Speaker of the House of Representatives of Jordan is the presiding officer of House of Representatives (Jordan).

Members of the House of Representatives elect a speaker for one year at the beginning of each session. The Speaker remains in office up to the beginning of the next session, and can be re-elected.

Source:

References

See also 
 List of speakers of the Chamber of Deputies of Jordan
 Parliament of Jordan

Politics of Jordan
Jordan